Donald Chaffin is a British artist, known for his illustrations for children's books, notably the first edition of Roald Dahl's Fantastic Mr Fox. He was also a consultant on Wes Anderson's stop-motion adaptation of the story, and received "special thanks" in the credits.

His 1969 painting of Lord Byron is in the collection of Newstead Abbey.

During development of the 2009 film adaptation of Fantastic Mr. Fox, director Wes Anderson reportedly enlisted Chaffin to help with the illustrations.

References

External links 

 

British painters
British male painters
British illustrators
Year of birth missing
Possibly living people